The lipid hypothesis (also known as the cholesterol hypothesis) is a medical theory postulating a link between blood cholesterol levels and the occurrence of cardiovascular disease. A summary from 1976 described it as: "measures used to lower the plasma lipids in patients with hyperlipidemia will lead to reductions in new events of coronary heart disease". It states, more concisely, that "decreasing blood cholesterol [...] significantly reduces coronary heart disease".

An accumulation of evidence has led to the acceptance of the lipid hypothesis by most of the medical community.

History
In 1856, the German pathologist Rudolf Virchow first described lipid accumulation in arterial walls, however the initial connection between arteriosclerosis and dietary cholesterol would not be established until the research of Russian pathologist Nikolay Anichkov, prior to World War I. In 1913, a study by Nikolay Anichkov showed that rabbits fed on cholesterol developed lesions in their arteries similar to atherosclerosis, suggesting a role for cholesterol in atherogenesis.

Dutch physician Cornelis de Langen noted the correlation between nutritional cholesterol intake and incidence of gallstones in  Javanese people in 1916. de Langen showed that the traditional Javanese diet, poor in cholesterol and other lipids, was associated with a low level of blood cholesterol and low incidence of cardiovascular disease (CVD), while the prevalence of CVD in Europeans living in Java on a Western diet was higher. Since de Langen published his results only in Dutch, his work remained unknown to most of the international scientific community until the 1940s and 1950s. By 1951, it was accepted that, although the causes of atheroma were still unknown, fat deposition was a major feature of the disease process. "The so-called fatty flecks or streaks of arteries are the early lesions of atherosclerosis and... may develop into the more advanced lesions of the disease."

Ancel Keys and the Seven Countries Study

Ancel Keys 

With the emergence of cardiovascular disease as a major cause of death in the Western world in the middle of the 20th century, the lipid hypothesis received greater attention. In the 1940s, a University of Minnesota researcher, Ancel Keys, postulated that the apparent epidemic of heart attacks in middle-aged American men was related to their mode of life and possibly modifiable physical characteristics. He first explored this idea in a group of Minnesota business and professional men that he recruited into a prospective study in 1947, the first of many cohort studies eventually mounted internationally. The first major report appeared in 1963 and the men were followed through until 1981. After fifteen years follow-up, the study confirmed the results of larger studies that reported earlier on the predictive value for heart attack of several risk factors: blood pressure, blood cholesterol level, and cigarette smoking.

Seven Countries Study 

Keys presented his diet-lipid-heart disease hypothesis at a 1955 expert meeting of the World Health Organization in Geneva. In response to criticism at the conference, Keys recruited collaborating researchers in seven countries to mount the first cross-cultural comparison, the years-long Seven Countries Study, which is still under observation today. This was to compare the heart attack risk in populations of men engaged in traditional occupations and being from cultures with different diets, especially in the proportion of fat calories of different composition. There was also criticism before the study began: Yerushalmy and Hilleboe pointed out that Keys had selected for the study the countries that would give him the results he wanted, while leaving out data from sixteen countries that would not; they also pointed out that Keys was studying a "tenuous association" rather than any possible proof of causation. Keys then joined the nutrition committee of the American Heart Association (AHA), successfully promulgated his idea, and in 1961 the AHA became the first group anywhere in the world to advise cutting back on saturated fat (and dietary cholesterol) to prevent heart disease. This historic recommendation was reported on the cover of Time Magazine in that same year.

The Seven Countries Study was formally started in fall 1958 in Yugoslavia. In total, 12,763 males, 40–59 years of age, were enrolled in seven countries, in four regions of the world (United States, Northern Europe, Southern Europe, Japan). One cohort is in the United States, two cohorts in Finland, one in the Netherlands, three in Italy, five in Yugoslavia (two in Croatia, and three in Serbia), two in Greece, and two in Japan. The entry examinations were performed between 1958 and 1964 with an average participation rate of 90%, lowest in the US, with 75% and highest in one of the Japanese cohorts, with 100%.

Keys' book Eat Well and Stay Well popularized the idea that reducing the amount of saturated fat in the diet would reduce cholesterol levels and the risks of serious diseases due to atheroma. Keys was followed during the rest of the 20th century by an accumulation of work that repeatedly demonstrated associations between cholesterol levels (and other modifiable risk factors including smoking and exercise) and risks of heart disease. These led to the acceptance of the lipid hypothesis as orthodoxy by much of the medical community. By the end of the 1980s, there were widespread academic statements that the lipid hypothesis was proven beyond reasonable doubt, or, as one article stated, "universally recognized as a law."

Consensus

The medical consensus supports the lipid hypothesis as evidence from separate meta-analyses, prospective epidemiologic studies and randomized clinical trials have demonstrated that elevated levels of LDL blood cholesterol are a significant risk factor for cardiovascular disease. Too much LDL (called 'bad cholesterol') can lead to fatty deposits building up in the arteries which increases the risk of cardiovascular disease. A 2017 consensus statement from the European Atherosclerosis Society concluded that "consistent evidence from numerous and multiple different types of clinical and genetic studies unequivocally establishes that LDL causes ASCVD." The consensus statement noted:

A review from the Journal of the American College of Cardiology in 2018 concluded:

The 2021 Canadian Cardiovascular Society Guidelines say "We recommend that for any patient with triglycerides > 1.5 mmol/L, non-HDL-C or ApoB be used instead of LDL-C as the preferred lipid parameter for screening (Strong Recommendation, High-Quality Evidence)".

See also 
 Hypercholesterolemia
 Lipid-lowering agent
 Fatty acid ratio in food

References 

Angiology
Cardiovascular diseases
Diets
Medical conditions related to obesity
Preventive medicine